This article details the list of Little League World Series winners by division. There are currently four World Series tournaments played each summer.

Little League Baseball Divisions

 Discontinued after 2016

Champions by year 

International teams were banned from the 1975 Little League World Series
 (H) Host team

Statistics

World Series won by Country/State

Most titles by tournament 

All–Time

Consecutive

The Intermediate World Series has yet to have a repeat champion

Winners of three World Series tournaments in the same year 

 ^ Won at every World Series level

Winners of two World Series tournaments in the same year 

 ^ Won at every World Series level

References 

champions by division